Caliph is a locality in the Murray Mallee region of South Australia. Its name was derived from a variety of wheat grown in the area.

Caliph was a station on the Moorook railway line which opened in 1925 and closed in 1971. The town was surveyed in May 1926 but no longer exists. The former community hall is a stone building near the railway station, but is no longer in use.

The next railway station north of Caliph was Bayah (where the railway crossed Mindarie Road) which is now included in the locality of Caliph. The station of Tuscan was where the railway crossed Farr Road, on the northern boundary of Caliph. The adjacent former town is now included in the locality of Wunkar. No infrastructure remains at either station.

References

Towns in South Australia